Kylie (also spelled Kilee, Kileigh, Kiley, Kylee, Kyleigh, Kyley, or Kyly) is a feminine given name. This name could derive from two different roots: 

 From the Noongar, an Indigenous Australian people, from the word , meaning 'curved, returning stick, boomerang'. 
 From the Irish surname O'Kiely, which in turn derives from the Old Gaelic surname O'Cadhla, meaning 'graceful or beautiful', descendant(s) of the graceful one.

The name became popular during the late 1960s to the early 1970s and was listed in 1970 in Australia as the fifth most popular girl's name. The Australian author Kylie Tennant (1912–1988) may have been the modern originator of this name. She was born Kathleen Tennant, but was called Kylie (her middle name) since her childhood. According to the Australian Dictionary of Biography, the publication of her third novel in 1941 "made her a household name and brought her international acclaim". "Kylie" first appeared on the list of 100 most popular female baby names in New South Wales in 1965, reaching a peak of popularity in 1972–1974 when it was the second most popular girl's name. In the United States, the name was first recorded in the top 1000 female baby names in 1978, but did not reach the top 100 until 2001. It remains a well-used name for girls there, with many spelling variations also in use.

People

Musicians and hosts

 Kylie Auldist, Australian singer
 Kylie Minogue (born 1968), Australian singer and actress
 Kylie Padilla (born 1993) Filipino singer and actress
 Kylie Price (born 1993), New Zealander singer-songwriter
 Kylie Rae Harris (1989–2019), American country singer-songwriter
 Kylie Speer, Australian television host

Athletes (association football)

 Kylie Bivens (born 1978), American former soccer player
 Kylie Cockburn (born 1988), Scottish football match official
 Kylie Fitts (born 1994), American football linebacker
 Kylie Louw (born 1989), South African footballer
 Kylie McCarthy (born 1987), English-born Welsh footballer
 Kylie Nolan (born 1998), Welsh footballer 
 Kylie Strom (born 1992), American soccer player

Athletes (other sports)

 Kylie Cronk (born 1984), Australian softball player
 Kylie Dickson (born 1999), American-born Belarusian artistic gymnast
 Kylie Dowling (born 1974), Australian Polocrosse rider
 Kylie Duarte (born 1993), American former pair skater
 Kylie Foy (born 1971), New Zealander former field hockey striker
 Kylie Gauci (born 1985), Australian wheelchair basketball player
 Kylie Gill (born 1974), Australian-born competitive skier from New Zealand
 Kylie Grimes (born 1987), British para-athlete
 Kylie Halliday (born c. 1981), Australian sports aerobics athlete
 Kylie Hanigan (born 1971), Australian sprinter
 Kylie Henry (born 1986), Scottish golfer
 Kylie Hilder (born 1976), Australian former rugby league footballer
 Kylie Hutson (born 1987), American track and field athlete
 Kylie Jameson (born 1976), New Zealand sailor
 Kylie Jones, British ballroom dancer
 Kylie Ledbrook (born 1986), Australian soccer player
 Kylie Leuluai (born 1978), New Zealand former rugby player
 Kylie Lindsay (born 1983), squash player who represents New Zealand
 Kylie Masse (born 1996), Canadian swimmer
 Kylie Palmer (born 1990), Australian swimmer
 Kylie Peters (born ), Australian cricketer
 Kylie Rae (born 1992), American wrestler
 Kylie Reed (born 1974), Australian former bobsledder and track and field athlete
 Kylie Risk (born 1973), Australian long-distance runner
 Kylie Robilliard (born 1988), athlete from Guernsey
 Kylie Shadbolt (born 1972), Australian artistic gymnast
 Kylie Shea (born 1986), American ballet dancer
 Kylie Stone (born 1987), Canadian female artistic gymnast
 Kylie Waterreus (born 1998), Dutch cyclist
 Kylie Wheeler (born 1980), Australian retired heptathlete
 Kylie Whitehead (born 1995), Australian lawn bowler

Actresses

 Kylie Babbington (born 1987), British actress
 Kylie Belling, Australian actress
 Kylie Bunbury (born 1989), Canadian-American actress
 Kylie Farmer, Aboriginal Australian actress
 Kylie Padilla (born 1993), Filipino-Australian actress, model, and recording artist
 Kylie Rogers (born 2004), American child actress
 Kylie Travis (born 1970), Australian actress
 Kylie Tyndall (born 1992), American identical twin actresses
 Kylie Verzosa (born 1992), Filipino actress
 Kylie Watson (born 1978), Australian actress, interior designer, and model

Other

 Kylie Adams, American author
 Kylie Bax (born 1975), New Zealander fashion model
 Kylie Bisutti (born 1990), American author 
 Kylie Brant, American author
 Kylie Chan, Australian author
 Kylie Gillies (born 1967), Australian television presenter
 Kylie Hercules (born 1989), Saint Helenian politician
 Kylie InGold (born 1962), Australian Artist of the Fairy Fantasy Genre
 Kylie Ireland (born 1970), American actress best known for her work in pornographic films
 Kylie Jenner (born 1997), American reality TV personality, Businesswoman, CEO and Founder of Kylie Cosmetics
 Kylie Kofoed (born 1991), Miss Idaho in 2010
 Kylie Kwong (born 1969), Australian television chef, author, television presenter and restaurateur
 Kylie Sonique Love (born 1983), American drag queen
 Kylie Maybury (1978–1984), Australian murder victim
 Kylie Moore-Gilbert, Australian-British academic and expert on Islamic studies
 Kylie Morris, Australian newsreader in the UK
 Kylie Oversen (born 1989), American politician
 Kylie Pentelow (born 1979), English journalist and TV news presenter
 Kylie Percival, Australian archivist
 Kylie Sturgess, Australian author and former President of the Atheist Foundation of Australia
 Kylie Tennant (1912–1988), Australian novelist, playwright, writer, critic, biographer, and historian
 Kylie Watson (British Army soldier), British Army medic
 Kylie Williams (born 1983), American beauty queen

Fictional characters
 Kylie Galen, the protagonist of the novel series Shadow Falls
 Kylie Griffin, a character in the Ghostbusters franchise
 Kylie Mole, a Comedy Company schoolgirl character
 Kylie Platt, a character on the British television series Coronation Street
 Kylie the Carnival Fairy, a character in the Rainbow Magic book franchise
 Kylie Smiley, a minor character in the Nelvana cartoon 6teen

See also
 Kyle (given name), unrelated but has a similar spelling
 Kylee, Keely, Kaylee, Kayleigh and Kayla
 Kylie (disambiguation)
Life of Kylie, an American reality television series
''[the name kylie can be spelled kylii

References

English feminine given names
Australian given names
English given names
Given names